Marondera East is a constituency of the National Assembly of the Parliament of Zimbabwe, located in Mashonaland East Province. Its current MP since a 26 March 2022 by-election is Jeremiah Chiwetu of ZANU–PF. The previous MP, Patrick Chidakwa of ZANU–PF died on 11 September 2020.

Election results 
In the March 2005 parliamentary election, the candidate of Zanu-PF, Sydney Sekeramayi, was declared the winner. This outcome was disputed.

References 

Marondera
Parliamentary constituencies in Zimbabwe